Eligible: A modern retelling of Pride and Prejudice is a 2016 novel written by Curtis Sittenfeld that is a modern-day reinterpretation of Jane Austen's novel Pride and Prejudice set in Cincinnati, Ohio.

Eligible is the latest book in the Austen Project, a series that pairs contemporary novelists with Jane Austen’s novels.

Plot
Eligible tells the story of the five Bennet sisters - Jane (39), Liz (38), Mary (30), Kathleen "Kitty" (26), and Lydia (23). Jane is a yoga instructor and Liz is a writer for fashion magazine Mascara. They both live in New York City, but return to their sprawling childhood Tudor home in Cincinnati after their father has a health scare. The Tudor house they grew up in is falling apart just like their family. Mary is pursuing her third master's degree in psychology and still lives at home. Meanwhile, Kitty and Lydia are more focused on their CrossFit classes and playing with their cell phones than moving out and finding jobs. Jane and Liz take over as the family caretakers, doing everything from cleaning to running errands to cooking healthy, doctor-approved meals for their father and the rest of the family.

While all of this is going on, Mrs. Bennet, the family matriarch, really wants her daughters to get married. She is thrilled when she learns that a contestant on the dating reality TV show Eligible is coming to live and work as a doctor in Cincinnati. This doctor is named Chip Bingley, so in order to initiate a meeting with her daughters, Mrs. Bennet contacts a family friend and physician who also works at Christ Hospital with Chip. The group has a barbeque for the Fourth of July, and Chip and Jane immediately become smitten with one another. Meanwhile, Liz feels disparaged and disrespected by Chip's judgmental sister, Caroline, and by Chip's fellow physician and friend, Fitzwilliam Darcy.

The rest of the novel is told through Liz's perspective as she navigates her love life and the ever-evolving changes in her family, from Lydia dating a new CrossFit trainer named Hamilton "Ham" Ryan to their Aunt Margot and her wealthy entrepreneur stepson, Cousin Willie, coming to visit the Tudor.

References

2016 American novels
English-language novels
Novels set in Cincinnati
Novels based on Pride and Prejudice
Random House books